Red Oak Community House, also known as Red Oak Community Building, is a historic clubhouse located at Red Oak, Nash County, North Carolina.  It was built in 1935, and is a one-story, side-gable, Rustic Revival style log building. It was listed on the National Register of Historic Places in 2006. 

The building consists of a main block and wing, and features two large stone chimneys.  It was built under the direction of the Emergency Relief Administration (ERA) to serve as the home of the Red Oak Home Demonstration Club.

References

Clubhouses on the National Register of Historic Places in North Carolina
Buildings and structures completed in 1935
Buildings and structures in Nash County, North Carolina
National Register of Historic Places in Nash County, North Carolina